Taralezh Island is the partly ice-free island 470 m long in west–east direction and 232 km wide in the Dannebrog Islands group of Wilhelm Archipelago in the Antarctic Peninsula region. Its surface area is 6.71 ha.

The feature is so named because of its shape supposedly resembling a hedgehog ('taralezh' in Bulgarian), and in association with other descriptive names of islands in the area.

Location
British mapping in 2001.

Maps
 British Admiralty Nautical Chart 446 Anvers Island to Renaud Island. Scale 1:150000. Admiralty, UK Hydrographic Office, 2001
 Brabant Island to Argentine Islands. Scale 1:250000 topographic map. British Antarctic Survey, 2008
 Antarctic Digital Database (ADD). Scale 1:250000 topographic map of Antarctica. Scientific Committee on Antarctic Research (SCAR). Since 1993, regularly upgraded and updated

See also
 List of Antarctic and subantarctic islands

Notes

References
 Taralezh Island. SCAR Composite Gazetteer of Antarctica
 Bulgarian Antarctic Gazetteer. Antarctic Place-names Commission. (details in Bulgarian, basic data in English)

External links
 Taralezh Island. Adjusted Copernix satellite image

Islands of the Wilhelm Archipelago
Bulgaria and the Antarctic